Nazmabad (also Romanized as Naz̧mābād; also known as Najmābād) is a village in Razmavaran Rural District, in the Central District of Rafsanjan County, Kerman Province, Iran. At the 2006 census, its population was 51, in 15 families.

References 

Populated places in Rafsanjan County